Nkolika "Nicky" Nonyelum Anosike (born February 27, 1986) is an American professional basketball player in the WNBA, most recently with the Los Angeles Sparks.

Personal
Anosike was born in Brooklyn, New York and grew up in Staten Island where she attended St. Peter's High School for Girls. Anosike was named a WBCA All-American. She participated in the 2004 WBCA High School All-America Game, where she scored one point. Her younger brother, O. D. Anosike, plays pro basketball for Scavolini Pesaro in Italy.

College
Anosike attended college at Tennessee and graduated in 2008. She had a cumulative GPA of 3.78 in her triple major studies in sociology/criminal justice, political science and legal studies. She began playing during the 2008 season and last took the court during the 2012 campaign. While at Tennessee, Anosike won back to back National Champions in 2007 and 2008. Anosike earned academic All-Southeastern Conference honors in 2005, 2006 and 2007. She was also on the Lady Vol honor roll and Tennessee Dean's List every semester of her collegiate career. She was named to the ESPN The Magazine Academic All-District IV third team in 2006 and to the first team in 2007 after a perfect 4.0 GPA in the fall semester of 2006. She was teammates with Candace Parker, Shannon Bobbitt, and Alexis Hornbuckle.

Tennessee statistics

Source

USA Basketball
Anosike was named to the USA Women's U19 team which represented the US in the 2005 U19 World's Championship, held in Tunis, Tunisia, in July and August 2007. Anosike averaged 11.4 points per game helping her team to a 7–0 record and a gold medal.

Anosike played for the USA team in the 2007 Pan American Games in Rio de Janeiro, Brazil. The team won all five games, earning the gold medal for the event.

WNBA career
Following her collegiate career she declared for the WNBA Draft. Anosike was selected in the 2nd round with the 16th overall pick of the 2008 WNBA Draft by the Minnesota Lynx. She was selected right after her college teammate Shannon Bobbitt who was selected by the Los Angeles Sparks where her other teammate Candace Parker will play. In Minnesota she started all the games for the Lynx while the first round pick, Candice Wiggins, came off the bench also winning the 6th Woman of the Year Award. Anosike was selected to the 2009 West All Star Team as a reserve, along with former teammate Charde Houston. Anosike was traded to the Washington Mystics on April 9, 2011.On February 23, 2012, Anosike was traded to the Los Angeles Sparks.

WNBA career statistics

Regular season

|-
| align="left" | 2008
| align="left" | Minnesota
| 34 || 34 || 27.1 || .438 || .000 || .699 || 6.8 || 1.3 || 2.2 || 1.3 || 1.2 || 9.2
|-
| align="left" | 2009
| align="left" | Minnesota
| 30 || 29 || 29.9 || .491 || .250 || .696 || 7.4 || 2.7 || 2.7 || 0.9 || 2.0 || 13.2
|-
| align="left" | 2010
| align="left" | Minnesota
| 31 || 30 || 29.9 || .372 || .000 || .773 || 6.8 || 1.9 || 2.0 || 1.0 || 2.1 || 9.2
|-
| align="left" | 2011
| align="left" | Washington
| 34 || 29 || 27.2 || .347 || .000 || .736 || 7.2 || 1.4 || 1.4 || 0.8 || 1.7 || 7.0
|-
| align="left" | 2012
| align="left" | Los Angeles
| 10 || 0 || 5.7 || .250 || .000 || 1.000 || 1.2 || 0.5 || 0.3 || 0.2 || 0.6 || 1.0
|-
| align="left" | Career
| align="left" | 5 years, 3 teams
| 139 || 122 || 26.8 || .415 || .167 || .725 || 6.6 || 1.7 || 1.9 || 1.0 || 1.7 || 8.9

Playoffs

|-
| align="left" | 2012
| align="left" | Los Angeles
| 3 || 0 || 6.3 || .375 || .000 || .500 || 1.7 || 0.7 || 0.3 || 0.0 || 1.0 || 2.3
|-
| align="left" | Career
| align="left" | 1 year, 1 team
| 3 || 0 || 6.3 || .375 || .000 || .500 || 1.7 || 0.7 || 0.3 || 0.0 || 1.0 || 2.3

Overseas
2009–2010:  Municipal MCM Târgovişte.
2010–2011:  Ros Casares Valencia.

Awards and achievements
 2009 WNBA All-Star Selection

Notes

External links
WNBA Player Profile
WNBA Prospect Profile
Tennessee Lady Vols profile

1986 births
Living people
Abdullah Gül Üniversitesi basketball players
American expatriate basketball people in China
American expatriate basketball people in Israel
American expatriate basketball people in Romania
American expatriate basketball people in Turkey
American women's basketball players
Basketball players at the 2007 Pan American Games
Basketball players from New York City
Beijing Great Wall players
Centers (basketball)
Club Sportiv Municipal Târgoviște players
Los Angeles Sparks players
Minnesota Lynx draft picks
Minnesota Lynx players
Pan American Games gold medalists for the United States
Pan American Games medalists in basketball
Parade High School All-Americans (girls' basketball)
Sportspeople from Brooklyn
Sportspeople from Staten Island
Tennessee Lady Volunteers basketball players
Washington Mystics players
Women's National Basketball Association All-Stars
Medalists at the 2007 Pan American Games
United States women's national basketball team players